The Cléon-Fonte engine,  also known as the Sierra engine or under the code "C-engine" or "C-Type" (C for Cléon, where it was built, fonte being French for cast iron), is a family of four-cylinder, inline automobile engines manufactured continuously by Renault and its subsidiary Dacia from 1962 to 2004. For about three decades it was a mainstay in Renault's compact models, before being gradually replaced by the E-type engine from the late 1980s onward.

The C-type is an overhead valve, water-cooled design, with a 5-bearing crankshaft, a chain driven, side-positioned camshaft operating the valves via pushrods and rockers, and an aluminum cylinder head.

History
When production started in 1962, this (then) modern engine was initially called the "Sierra"; it was soon renamed the "Cléon-Fonte", taking its name from the ultra-modern Renault factory where it was first manufactured. Cars fitted with the engine range from the Floride/Caravelle through the first generation Twingo of 1993, thirty years after this power unit was presented to the press at Geneva.

Technical adaptations enabled the production of this engine in many displacements in single and dual carburettor forms, later with fuel injection, with or without turbo. The Cléon-Fonte was coupled initially to four-speed manual transmissions, and then later five speed and automatic gearboxes according to its applications and the natural progress of the automotive industry.

It was fitted in one form or another to an impressive list of Renault models, in rear-, mid- or front engined (longitudinal or transverse) configurations, including: Floride/Caravelle, Alpine A110, R4, R5 (Le Car in the USA), R6, R7 (Siete), R8/R10, R9/R11 (Alliance/Encore in USA), R12, R15, R18, R19, R21 (Export), Estafette, Traffic 1, Express (Rapid / Extra), Fuego, Twingo, Clio 1, not to mention the Renault R12 based Dacia 1300/1310 range produced from 1969 to 2004. On Monday, 29 November 2004, Dacia produced the last C-engine, which was a 1.6 litre, fuel injected model, producing 68 horsepower and with the serial number 2527155. The C-engine stopped production four months after that of the Dacia 1310. Dacia continues to manufacture components of the Cléon-Fonte engine for the purposes of service in Romania and abroad. In total, more than 27 million units of the Cléon-Fonte were produced by Renault and Dacia since its launch, 15 million of which were built in France. This engine was also assembled in Portugal, Spain, Turkey, Colombia and Argentina.

In France, the Cléon-Fonte ended its career in December 1996 in the Twingo and Clio which used the  C3G, and the Supercinq "Bye Bye", fitted with the  C3J; this also marked the end of Renault 5 production. In total, this engine had an unusually long career: nearly half a century.

27,277,306 Cléon-Fonte engines were manufactured in 42 years, a record in Europe (some American V8 have far exceeded this number). Behind this record, the strength and versatility of the Renault engine has enabled it to power many very different cars, mounted in every position imaginable: rear mounted rear drive, front mounted rear drive, longitudinal or transverse front wheel drive and was used by Volvo in their Daf 55/66 and Volvo 340.

Design
In the late 1950s, Renault engineering, led by the engineer Fernand Picard, decided to develop a modern version of the "Billancourt engine" from the Dauphine for the future Renault 8 model. Consisting of a cast iron block topped with an aluminum cylinder head, this engine was characterized by its camshaft placed high in the block with short pushrods, and, unusually for the time, five crankshaft bearings. From the first test, it showed more torque and considerably more power than the  "Billancourt", whose design dated back to 1944. It was baptized the "Sierra", because at that time, Renault had not yet adopted its later scheme of designating each engine design with a letter. It was later that it took the name "Cléon", referring to the plant where it was made, combined with "Fonte" (meaning "cast-iron" in French) to distinguish it from the aluminum-block Renault 16 Cléon-Alu engine; it was later shortened to the "C engine."

The engine made its official debut at the Geneva Motor Show in the new 1962 Renault Floride S, replacing the   Dauphine Gordini. The  capacity, which delivered a dozen additional horsepower, ( SAE), a few months later was seen in the new R8 sedan. Gordini revealed some weaknesses in the rigidity of the block which could lead to blown head gaskets; this prompted Renault to stiffen the block slightly.

1963 saw an  version of the engine introduced. This was fitted to the latest version of Renault Floride/Caravelle, a car whose timid performance was greatly improved.

In the late 1960s, the Cléon-Fonte was the engine used for most small Renaults. Installed in both the R8 and R10 sedans of the time, it was also produced in Valladolid, Spain. At the end of 1966, to power the new R8 Gordini 1300, it received a new block with a specific lateral offset crankshaft, this time  in capacity and producing  DIN.

At the close of 1969, Renault launched its front-wheel drive R12. Now known as the "C-Engine", the "Cléon-Fonte" was installed, this time ahead of the driver. It was reworked to a displacement of  producing  and had a uniform spacing between the cylinders. Despite the engine's flexibility, it was not powerful enough to power the sporty versions of the R12 and Alpine Berlinetta. This  version was installed in the R12 and R15 TL. Mated to a new front drive transaxle, the  version of C-engine was now found under the hood of the R6, and later in the R5.

In this time period, Renault chose small saloon cars to represent the company in automobile racing. To do this, Renault began with work similar to that Gordini had done 10 years earlier, but at a much lower cost.

Meanwhile, the R4 GTL had received the  version; the basic model retained its ancient "Billancourt" 845cc engine, but in 1986 the R4 was entirely C-engine powered, the base model receiving the  unit. The new R18, which succeeded the R12, received the  version of this engine, with a standard cylinder head, and several options for power specifications. It is in this capacity, but now in a transverse position, this unit found its way under the hood of the R9, (car of the year 1982) and its sister R11, then under the Super 5 in 1985.

The Renault 9 and 11 were important developments for Renault as they inaugurated a new technical philosophy that would be used on many models. Indeed, the chassis was reused for the Renault 19, Megane 1 and Scenic 1; derivatives were used for the Super 5, Express, Clio 1, Clio 2, Kangoo 1 and Twingo 2. The Renault 9 and Renault 11 were the first cars to use a Renault engine in a transverse position, which gave rise to the "JB" gearbox which was used until the Twingo 2.

Renault chose to use the turbocharged  Cléon engine in several cars of the early 1980s. The pushrod Cléon engine was chosen for its sturdiness and low cost. For cost concerns it was fitted with a Solex carburetor, albeit a special unit made from magnesium in order to withstand the high heat from the turbocharger.

At the end of 1980, thanks to a big turbo, the impressive  R5 Turbo was launched. Mounted in a mid-engined position for the first time, this 1397cc unit was coupled to the transmission of the R30 TX and drove the rear wheels.

After the arrival of the Renault R19 and Clio in the early 1990s, this engine (which however has adapted very well to changing emission standards, with injection and catalytic converters) lived its last days alongside its replacement, the "Energy" engine.

When the Renault 14 was released in 1976, it was thought that the Cléon-Fonte engine would disappear since the 14 was equipped with the PSA-Renault X-Type engine of the Society Française de Mécanique common to Peugeot and Renault. This collaboration with the main competitor at the time was badly perceived by customers and the Renault service network. So, for the Renault 9 and Renault 11 to replace the Renault 14, Renault returned to the Cléon-Fonte engine that was already starting to be considered an antique in the early 80s. The Renault 9 gave a second life to the Cléon-Fonte, which was mounted transversely, a first for Renault, and coupled to the JB gearbox.

Many journalists panned the Twingo for using this engine. The Energy and Clio R19 engine, due to its overhead cam, hemispherical cylinder head design with exhaust ports at the front of the head, could not go under the hood of the little Twingo. However, in late 1996, the new  D7F engine, which was more modern, replaced the long serving Cléon engine in the base model Clio and the Twingo.

The Cléon-Fonte engine was thus resurrected twice, first by the Renault 9 in 1981 and again in 1993 by the Twingo.

The Cléon-Fonte continue to be manufactured by Dacia until the end of 2004 in R12 derived saloons.

Engine development
The Cléon-Fonte engine evolved into the "Energy engine", first seen in the Renault 19. The engine block is greatly modified as the camshaft is moved to the cylinder head and the chain drive is replaced by belt drive. The cylinder head is completely new, adopting an overhead camshaft driven by a toothed timing belt. The  "Energy engine" and  "Cléon-Fonte" have the same stroke and bore.

Subsequently, the "Energy engine"  evolved into the "K engine" which appeared in the Mégane 1. The main change from the Energy is the cylinders bored directly into the iron block. The head of the Energy is retained in 8 valve versions, whilst 16V versions are also available, as are diesels (Engine K9K - 1.5 dCi).

Sports applications

 Renault 8 Gordini
 Alpine A110
 Renault 5 LS
 Renault 5 Alpine
 Renault 5 Alpine Turbo
 Renault 5 Turbo and Turbo 2
 Renault 9 GTS
 Renault 9 Turbo
 Renault 11 Turbo
 Renault Super 5 GT Turbo
 Renault Super 5 TS
 Dacia 1410 Sport
 DAF 55 Marathon
 DAF 66 Marathon
 René Bonnet Djet

Common cylinder capacities

 *  Gordini and  Gordini have the distinction of having the same engine types :  804  , despite the difference in displacement. These two engines will equip Renault 8 Gordini and Alpine A110.

Unusual and competition capacities

Other manufacturers

The Cléon-Fonte engine was also used by Volvo, DAF, Ford and Volkswagen Brazil

CxC
The C1C (original name "689") displaces :

Renault 8 base (1962–1968);
Renault Floride S (1962–1963);
Renault Caravelle base (1963–1968);
Renault 5 TL (1972–1979);
Renault 5 Super 5 TC 1985
Renault Extra 1986
Alpine-Renault A110 1.0 (1962–1964);
Renault 6 base (only for the Spanish Market);
Renault 4 TL (1986-1992).

CxE
The C1E (original name "688") displaces .

Renault 8 Major (1964–1965);
Renault 8 base (1968–1973);
Renault 10 base (1965–1971);
Renault 5 (1972–1985);
Renault 4 (1978–1994);
Renault 5 Super 5 (1985);
Renault R9 (1982–1989);
Renault R11 (1983–1989);
Renault Clio (1991–1994);
Renault Extra (1986);
Renault Estafette (1962-1968);
Dacia 1100 (1968-1971);
DAF 55 (1967–1972);
DAF 66 (1972–1975);
Volvo 66 1.1 (1975–1980); called B110 by Volvo
René Bonnet Le Mans (1962-1964);
René Bonnet/Matra Djet (1964–1967).
DTN/DTR 40 Marine engine(1965-1978)

CxG
The C1G was essentially a downsleeved version of the 1.3-litre 810 engine and was replaced by the C3G with almost identical displacement. This, however, was an oversquare, bored out version of the 1.1-liter C1E engine. The C3G was produced through July 1996.

 C1G (1237 cc)
 1987–1990 Renault Super 5
 1985–1989 Renault R9
 1985–1989 Renault R11
 1988–1989 Renault R19
 1986– Renault Express
 C3G (1239 cc)
 1993–1996 Renault Twingo
 1995–1996 Renault Clio
 1995–1996 Renault Express

CxH/810
It was mostly taken out of production before the alphanumeric codes were introduced, although some late versions are called C1H.

 1968-1972 Ford Corcel
 1969-1980 Renault 12 L, TL
 1972-1979 Renault 12 TS
 1969-2004 Dacia 1300/1310
 1970-1971 Renault 10
 1973-1975 DAF 66 Marathon
 1976-1980 Volvo 66, called the B130 by Volvo
 1976-1981 Renault 5, 5 Automatic

CxJ

 C1J
 1972–1985 Renault 5
 1984–1987 Renault Super 5
 1985–1991 Renault Super 5 Turbo
 1982–1989 Renault R9
 1985–1989 Renault R9 Turbo
 1983–1989 Renault R11
 1984–1989 Renault R11 Turbo
 1984–1985 Renault R18
 1988 Renault R19
 1986 Renault Extra
 1985–1989 Renault Trafic
 1983–1989 Renault 12 (Turkey)
 1989–2000 Renault 12 Toros (Turkey)
 C2J
 1984–1990 Renault Super 5
 1982–1989 Renault R9
 1983–1989 Renault R11
 1988-1994 Renault R19
 1985–1989 Renault R21
 1986 Renault Extra
 C3J
 1985 Renault 5 Super 5
 1985–1989 Renault R9
 1985–1989 Renault R11
 1988-1994 Renault R19
 1986 Renault Extra
 C6J
 1980–1984 Renault 5 Turbo
 1982–1984 Renault 5 Alpine Turbo
 Dacia 102.00/102.13/102.14/102.41 (Romanian variant)
 1983-2004 Dacia 1310/1410
 B14
 1976–1991 Volvo 340

CxL
An Argentinian-developed engine, this was only available in Argentina, Brazil, Colombia and Turkey. It is derived from the CxJ and shares the dimensions with Renault's A-series engine displaces . The twin-carb version is called the C2L, while the single-point fuel injection version is the C3L.

Brazil:
 1996-1999 Renault Clio RL, RN and RT
 1996-2001 Renault Express RN (C3L, monopoint injection version)
 1994-1998 Renault 19 RN, RL

Colombia:
 1989 Renault 21 RS
 1989 Renault 9 TXE
 1990 Renault Étoile TS (21 TS) Saloon and Estate (Break)
 1996 Renault 19 1600
Argentina:
 1989 Renault 18 GTS
 1989 Renault 11 TXE, RL, RN
 1989 Renault 9  GTL/RL TXE, RN
 1991 Renault 12 GTL
 1993 Renault 19 RN
 1996 Renault 19 RL
 1996 Renault Express RN (C3L, monopoint injection version)
 1997 Renault 19 RE
 1997 Renault Clio I (C3L version)
Turkey:
 1993-1996 Renault 9 and 11 Fairway
 1991 Renault 12
 Renault 19 1.6 RT

References

Cleon-Fonte
Straight-four engines
Gasoline engines by model